Aurilândia is a municipality in eastern Goiás state, Brazil.

Location
The distance to the state capital is 146 km. while the distance to the main regional center São Luís de Montes Belos is 23 km.
Highway connections from Goiânia are made by state highway BR-069 west from Goiânia, through Trindade, São Luís de Montes Belos, and then 23 kilometers south to Aurilândia.

Neighboring municipalities are São Luís de Montes Belos, Firminópolis, São João da Paraúna, and Paraúna.

Demographics
Population density: 6,58 inhabitants/km2 (2007)
Population growth rate:  -1.93% 1996/2007
Population in 1980: 4,953
Population in 2007: 3,719
Urban population: 2,762

Economy
The main economic activities are cattle raising, agriculture, commerce, and small transformation industries.  Public administration is the largest employer.  There is a large informal economy.  There were 61,200 head of cattle (6,000 milking cows) in 2006.  The main agricultural products were bananas, hearts of palm, rice, manioc, and corn.  There were 400 automobiles and pickup trucks in 2007, giving a ratio of 9 inhabitants for each motor vehicle.  
Number of farms: 341
Total agricultural area: 50,397 ha. 
Planted area: 610 ha. 
Area of natural pasture: 39,767e
Persons employed in agriculture: 986 (IBGE 2006)

Health and education
The infant mortality rate in 2000 was 24.88.  There was 1 small hospital (2007) with 19 beds.  The literacy rate in 2000 was 84.3%.  There were 3  schools with 826 students in 2006.  
The score on the Municipal Human Development Index was 0.732, giving it a state ranking of 140 (out of 242 municipalities) and a national ranking of 2,390 (out of 5,507 municipalities).  For the complete list see frigoletto.com.br

References

 Frigoletto

Municipalities in Goiás